Mark Baker (born May 13, 1962) is an American politician. He served as a member of the Mississippi House of Representatives from the 74th District from 2003 to 2020. He is a member of the Republican party. In 2018, Baker announced his candidacy for Attorney General of Mississippi in the 2019 elections. He came in third place in the race.

References

1962 births
Living people
Republican Party members of the Mississippi House of Representatives
21st-century American politicians